Humming is the second album by American singer-songwriter Duncan Sheik. It was released on Atlantic Records in 1998.

Release and reception
The album was met with moderate success and favorable reviews. According to Allmusic, the album "sprawls across similarly introspective terrain, yet veers more toward the pragmatic than the romantic", adding, "Humming has a more profound and resonant base, complemented by accentuated drums and various string elements."

Details

The album, which featured the London Session Orchestra on some tracks, contained tributes to other artists, including "That Says It All" and "A Body Goes Down"; the latter song is an elegy for Jeff Buckley, following his death in 1997, which was also included in the documentary Amazing Grace: Jeff Buckley. The final track is named after Nichiren, who was a Buddhist monk of 13th century Japan.

Track listing
"In Between" - 4:32
"Rubbed Out" - 5:09
"Bite Your Tongue" - 3:56
"Alibi" - 4:07
"Varying Degrees of Con-Artistry" - 6:56
"That Says It All" - 4:14
"Everyone, Everywhere" - 3:30
"A Body Goes Down" - 6:05
"Nothing Special" - 3:28
"House Full of Riches" - 5:37
"Nichiren" - 14:47**

**Note: A hidden song, "Foreshadowing," begins at the 6:40 mark of track 11 after the close of "Nichiren"

Personnel
 Duncan Sheik - acoustic guitar, electric guitar, harmonium, piano, resonator guitar, lead vocals, backing vocals
 Jeff Allen - six-string bass guitar, bass guitar, acoustic bass
 Simon Hale - string arrangements, conductor
 Rupert Hine - harmonium, piano, treated piano, backing vocals
 Matt Johnson - drums
 Jarod Lanier - alto flute on "A Body Goes Down" and "Nichiren"
 Gerry Leonard - acoustic guitar, electric guitar
 London Session Orchestra - strings
 Jay Bellerose - drums on "In Between"
 Abdellah Miry - violin on "A Body Goes Down"
 Trevor Morais - bass drums
 Mark Plati - bass guitar
 Juliet Prater - bodhran, percussion
 Spooky Ghost - guitar loops (tracks 2,3,6,10)
Technical
Ruadhri Cushnan - recording
Bob Clearmountain - mixing

Notes 

1998 albums
Duncan Sheik albums
Albums produced by Rupert Hine
Atlantic Records albums